Willem Philippe Maria "Wim" Zaal (14 August 1935, Amsterdam - 11 October 2021, Muiden) was a Dutch journalist, essayist, translator and literary critic. He was literary editor of Elsevier for years.

He has edited anthologies from the works of many authors, including Joost van den Vondel. He translated works by the Belgian writer Neel Doff from French into Dutch and also translated the memoirs of King Louis Bonaparte in 1983.

Zaal also wrote a few books about Italy, a country that has always fascinated him.

In 2001, Queen Beatrix of the Netherlands awarded him the Honorary Cross of the Order of the House of Orange.

Works
Vloekjes bij de thee: Een reportage over de 19de eeuw in Nederland, J.M. Meulenhoff, Amsterdam, 1961. Re-issued in 1993 by Goossens, Rijswijk
Zó ben ik nu eenmaal: Nederlanders schrijven over zichzelf in dagboeken, autobiografieën en brieven, Bonaventura, Amsterdam, 1962
Aan de rol met Sisyfus: Divagatiën en consideratiën, Wereldbibliotheek, Amsterdam, 1964
De Herstellers: Lotgevallen van de Nederlandse fascisten, Ambo, Utrecht, 1966
Nooit van gehoord: Stiefkinderen van de Nederlandse beschaving, Ambo, Utrecht, 1969. Re-issued in 1974 by De Arbeiderspers, Amsterdam
Geliefde Gedichten die iedereen kent maar niet kan vinden, De Arbeiderspers, Amsterdam, 1972
Gods onkruid: Nederlandse sekten en messiassen, J.M. Meulenhoff, Amsterdam, 1972. Re-issued in 1985 by Kruseman, The Hague, and in 2004 by Aspekt, Soesterberg
De Nederlandse fascisten,  Wetenschappelijke Uitgeverij, Amsterdam, 1973
Geheime Gedichten: Die Niemand Kent Maar Die Toch Gezien Mogen Worden, De Arbeiderspers, Amsterdam, 1974
Zoek het koninkrijk: Heiligenlevens voor niet-gelovigen verteld, J.M. Meulenhoff, Amsterdam, 1976
Rome: Gids om Rome lief te hebben, J.H. Gottmer, Haarlem, 1977.
De heiligen: Erflaters van Europa, Ambo, Baarn, 1982
Flip van der Burgt: 1927-1977, Stichting Vrienden van Flip van der Burgt, Amsterdam, 1984
Voorlopige uitslag, De Oude Degel, Eemnes, 1985
Rome, Terra, Zutphen, 1985
Vlak bij Vlaanderen: Een Hollander over het zuiden, Manteau, Antwerpen/Amsterdam, 1986
Verhalen van man tot man, Goossens, Tricht, 1987
Een tik van Italië: Reisverhalen, Amber, Amsterdam, 1991. Re-issued in 2001 by Aspekt, Soesterberg
De verlakkers, Amber, Amsterdam, 1991. Re-issued in 2009 as Valsheid in geschriften
Roma magica: Mysteries en mirakelen van de eeuwige stad, Conserve, Schoorl, 1993
Onnozele kinderen: Lodewijk XVII, Victor van Aveyron, Kaspar Hauser, De Arbeiderspers, Amsterdam, 1995
De buitenbeentjes: 36 schrijvers die ik heb gekend, Aspekt, Nieuwegein, 1995
De vuist van de paus: De Nederlandse zouaven in Italië, 1860-1870, Aspekt, Nieuwegein, 1996
De eeuwige belofte van Eldorado, Aspekt, Nieuwegein, 1996
Rust in Rome: Wandelen langs dodenakkers, grafkerken, catacomben, mausolea en andere plaatsen van eeuwige rust, Elmar, Rijswijk, 1999
Bar en boos: De slechtste gedichten in de Nederlandse taal, Prometheus, Amsterdam, 2001
Zestig jaar in de beschaving, Aspekt, Soesterberg, 2002
Engelenzang en andere gedichten, De Beuk, Amsterdam, 2003
Rome: een religieuze gids, Aspekt, Soesterberg, 2004
Alle heiligen: Heiligenkalender voor Nederland en Vlaanderen, Elmar, Rijswijk, 2004
Moord in het Vaticaan: De mooiste verhalen over Rome, Aspekt, Soesterberg, 2006
Een leeuw is eigenlijk iemand: Nederlandstalige dierenpoëzie, J.M. Meulenhoff, Amsterdam, 2006
God en Zoon: Wat iedereen moet weten over bijbel, christendom en kerkelijke feesten, Aspekt, Soesterberg, 2007
Kaspar Hauser, Aspekt, Soesterberg, 2008
De 100 leukste dierengedichten, J.M. Meulenhoff, Amsterdam, 2009
Valsheid in geschriften: Literaire vervalsingen en mystificaties, Aspekt, Soesterberg, 2009 (re-issue of De verlakkers)
Jan Toorop: Zijn leven, zijn werk, zijn tijd, Aspekt, Soesterberg, 2010

References

External links
Wim Zaal at www.uitgeverijaspekt.nl 

1935 births
Living people
Dutch journalists
Dutch translators
Dutch essayists
Dutch literary critics
Writers from Amsterdam